The Sacred Heart Pioneers men's basketball team represents Sacred Heart University in Fairfield, Connecticut, United States.  The school's team currently competes in the Northeast Conference. They play their home games at the William H. Pitt Center. During their time as members of the NCAA Division II, they were national champions in 1986.

History
In 1983, Keith Bennett became the school's leading career scorer.  He was named a National Association of Basketball Coaches Division II All-American in 1981, 1982, and 1983, and Regional Player of the Year in 1982 and 1983.

2014–15 was the 50th season of Pioneer basketball. Sacred Heart's first year of competition was the 1965–66 season under coach Don Feeley. Sacred Heart joined NCAA Division I in the 1999–2000 season.

Classification

Home court

Conference affiliation

Postseason

NCAA Division II Tournament results
The Pioneers have appeared in 13 NCAA Division II Tournaments. Their combined record is 22–15. They were national champions in 1986.

References

External links
Website